is a 1962 Japanese drama film directed by Yasujirō Ozu for Shochiku Films. It stars Ozu regular Chishū Ryū as the patriarch of the Hirayama family who eventually realises that he has a duty to arrange a marriage for his daughter Michiko (Shima Iwashita). It was Ozu's last film; he died the following year on the day he turned 60.

Today, An Autumn Afternoon is considered by many to be one of Ozu's finest works.

Plot

Tokyo, 1962. Shūhei Hirayama (Chishū Ryū) is an aging widower with a 32-year-old married son, Kōichi (Keiji Sada), and two unmarried children, 24-year-old daughter Michiko (Shima Iwashita) and 21-year-old son Kazuo (Shin'ichirō Mikami). The ages of the children and what they respectively remember about their mother suggests that she died just before the end of the war, perhaps in the bombing of Tokyo in 1944–45. Since his marriage, Kōichi has moved out to live with his wife in a small flat, leaving Hirayama and Kazuo to be looked after by Michiko.

Hirayama and five of his classmates from middle-school, Kawai (Nobuo Nakamura), Horie (Ryūji Kita), Sugai (Tsūzai Sugawara), Watanabe (Masao Oda) and Nakanishi, hold regular reunions at a restaurant called Wakamatsu ("Young Pine"), which is owned by Sugai. They reminisce about old times and banter with each other. For example, Horie is teased about having a new young wife and asked whether he is taking pills to maintain his virility.

Their old teacher of Chinese classics, Sakuma (Eijirō Tōno), nicknamed Hyōtan ("the Gourd"), attends one of the reunions. We learn from a remark of his that Hirayama went from school to the Imperial Japanese Naval Academy, so would have been a career naval officer up to 1945. Sakuma has too much to drink, and when Kawai and Hirayama take him home, they find that he has fallen on hard times and is running a cheap noodle restaurant in a working-class area. They meet his middle-aged daughter Tomoko (Haruko Sugimura), who missed the chance to marry when young and is now too old.

Sakuma's former pupils decide to help him out with a gift of money, and Hirayama goes back to the restaurant to hand it over. While he is there, Yoshitarō Sakamoto (Daisuke Katō), the owner of a small local car-repair shop, comes in for a bowl of noodles and recognises Hirayama as the captain of the ship in which he served as a Petty Officer during the war. He takes Hirayama to his favourite bar. Hirayama notices that the bar-owner Kaoru (Kyōko Kishida) resembles his dead wife. Kaoru puts on a recording of the patriotic song Warship March and Sakamoto marches up and down, holding a salute and singing meaningless syllables in time to the music, in a mocking version of military drill. Later, Hirayama visits the bar alone and Kaoru puts the record on again. Two tipsy customers begin to parody the kind of morale-boosting radio propaganda announcements that would have been introduced by this tune during the war.

Kōichi borrows 50,000 yen from his father, ostensibly to buy a refrigerator, but this is more than the refrigerator will cost. He plans to use the extra money to buy a set of second-hand golf clubs from his colleague Miura (Teruo Yoshida).  His wife Akiko (Mariko Okada) does not want him to do so, and says that if he is going to indulge himself like this, she will spend money on an expensive white leather handbag. Eventually, having made her point, she relents.

The "Gourd" tells his former pupils that it is because he selfishly kept her at home to look after him that his daughter is now condemned to a lonely life as a spinster. Troubled by this, Hirayama recognises his own selfishness in keeping Michiko at home to look after him, and decides to arrange a marriage for her. He asks Kōichi to find out if Miura, whom Michiko is fond of, is interested.  Unfortunately, Miura is already engaged.  Kōichi and Hirayama break the news to Michiko. Michiko does not react but retires to her room. Hirayama and Kōichi conclude that she is not upset, but a little later Kazuo comes in and asks why Michiko is crying.  Hirayama later asks Michiko if she is willing to go for a matchmaking session with a candidate Kawai has selected.  Michiko agrees.

In one of the ellipses Ozu is famous for, the film next shows us Michiko being dressed in a traditional wedding kimono and head-dress. She has clearly agreed to marry, but the bridegroom, and the wedding ceremony, are never shown. After the wedding, Hirayama goes to a bar with friends while Kōichi, Akiko and Kazuo wait for him at home. When he returns, drunk, Kōichi and Akiko leave. Kazuo goes to bed, leaving Hirayama by himself.

In the final scene, a melancholy Hirayama drunkenly sings snatches of the Warship March. His last words in the film are "Alone, eh?".

Cast
 Chishū Ryū	 as Shūhei Hirayama
 Shima Iwashita as Michiko Hirayama
 Keiji Sada as Kōichi Hirayama
 Mariko Okada as Akiko Hirayama
 Teruo Yoshida as Yutaka Miura
 Noriko Maki as Fusako Taguchi
 Shin'ichirō Mikami as Kazuo Hirayama
 Nobuo Nakamura as Shūzō Kawai
 Kuniko Miyake as Nobuko Kawai, his wife
 Eijirō Tōno as Seitarō Sakuma, "The Gourd"
 Haruko Sugimura as Tomoko Sakuma, his daughter
 Kyōko Kishida as the proprietor of the bar "Kaoru"
 Ryūji Kita as Shin Horie
 Michiyo Kan as Tamako, his second wife
 Daisuke Katō as Yoshitarō Sakamoto 
 Tsūzai Sugawara as Sugai
 Masao Oda as Watanabe
 Toyo Takahashi as Waitress at "Wakamatsu"
 Shinobu Asaji as Yōko Sasaki, Shūhei's secretary
 Matsuko Shiga as Woman at Kōichi and Akiko's apartment
 Fujio Suga as First Tipsy Customer at "Kaoru"
 Zen'ichi Inagawa as Second Tipsy Customer at "Kaoru"

Production

It was shot using Agfacolor, and the credits of the film are placed before a backdrop of painted fronds instead of the sackcloth used in all of Ozu's films since A Story of Floating Weeds in 1934.

The Japanese title, "A Taste of Sanma", refers to the sanma or Pacific saury fish. As a seasonal food, sanma is used in Japanese culture to represent autumn. Ozu chose this as representative of the changes taken place in Japan (cf. the Spring and Autumn Period).

Release

Reception
An Autumn Afternoon is widely regarded as a masterpiece. Film critic Roger Ebert placed the film in his "Great Movies" collection, writing, "From time to time I return to Ozu feeling a need to be calmed and restored. He is a man with a profound understanding of human nature, about which he makes no dramatic statements. We are here, we hope to be happy, we want to do well, we are locked within our aloneness, life goes on." 
On Rotten Tomatoes, the film has a 95% rating based on 22 reviews, with an average rating of 8.8/10.

Home media
The Criterion Collection released the film in the US on DVD in 2008, and Blu-ray in 2014.

In 2011, the BFI released a Region 2 Dual Format Edition (Blu-ray + DVD). Included with this release is a standard definition presentation of A Hen in the Wind.

It was shown as part of the Cannes Classics section of the 2013 Cannes Film Festival.

References

External links
 
 An Autumn Afternoon: A Fond Farewell an essay by Geoff Andrew at the Criterion Collection

1962 films
1962 drama films
Japanese drama films
1960s Japanese-language films
Films about alcoholism
Shochiku films
Films directed by Yasujirō Ozu
Films with screenplays by Yasujirō Ozu
Films with screenplays by Kogo Noda
Films set in Tokyo
1960s Japanese films